Oliver Marach and Mate Pavić were the defending champions, but chose not to defend their title.

Luke Bambridge and Jonny O'Mara won the title, defeating Marcus Daniell and Wesley Koolhof in the final, 7–5, 7–6(10–8).

Seeds

Draw

Draw

References
 Main Draw

Stockholm Open - Doubles
Doubles